Carolyn Nelson is a North Dakota Democratic-NPL Party member of the North Dakota Senate, representing the 21st district since 1994. She currently serves as Assistant Minority Leader. She was previously a member of the North Dakota House of Representatives, representing the 45th District from 1986 through 1988, and the 21st District from 1992 through 1994.

In Fall 2017, Nelson announced her intention to retire and not run for re-election in 2018.

References

External links
North Dakota State Legislature - Senator Carolyn Nelson official ND Senate website
Project Vote Smart - Senator Carolyn Nelson (ND) profile
Follow the Money – Carolyn Nelson
2006 2004 2002 1998 Senate campaign contributions
North Dakota Democratic-NPL Party - Senator Carolyn Nelson profile

North Dakota state senators
Members of the North Dakota House of Representatives
1937 births
Living people
Women state legislators in North Dakota
21st-century American politicians
21st-century American women politicians
20th-century American politicians
20th-century American women politicians